The İstanbul Paten Kulübü (literally: "Istanbul Skating Club") is an ice hockey sports club established 1987 in Istanbul, Turkey. The team participates in the Turkish Hockey SuperLig (TBHSL). Istanbul Paten plays out of the Galleria Ice Rink at Bakırköy, Istanbul. The club's colors are blue, white and red.

The team won the TBHSL championship in the 1997–98 season.

References

Ice hockey teams in Turkey
Turkish Ice Hockey Super League teams
Sport in Istanbul
Ice hockey clubs established in 1987
1987 establishments in Turkey